Bondeno is a comune (municipality) in the Province of Ferrara in the Italian region Emilia-Romagna, located about  north of Bologna and about  northwest of Ferrara.

The municipality of Bondeno contains the frazioni (subdivisions, mainly villages and hamlets) Burana, Gavello, Ospitale, Pilastri, Ponte Rodoni, Salvatonica, San Biagio, Santa Bianca, Scortichino, Settepolesini, Stellata, and Zerbinate.

Bondeno borders the following municipalities: Cento, Ferrara, Ficarolo, Finale Emilia,   Mirandola, Sermide e Felonica, Terre del Reno, Vigarano Mainarda. Its territory is crossed by the Panaro river.

History 
In the 1463, in the city of Bondeno was probably printed the first movable character book of the whole Italian history, a Bible, using the printing press method.

Government

List of mayors

Twin towns
 Dillingen an der Donau, Germany
 Bihać, Bosnia and Herzegovina
 Orsha, Belarus

References

External links
 Official website

Cities and towns in Emilia-Romagna